Down most often refers to:

 Down, the relative direction opposed to up
 Down (gridiron football), in American/Canadian football, a period when one play takes place
 Down feather, a soft bird feather used in bedding and clothing
 Downland, a type of hill

Down may also refer to:

Places
 County Down, Northern Ireland, UK
 Down (Parliament of Ireland constituency), abolished 1800
 Down (Northern Ireland Parliament constituencies)
 Down (Northern Ireland Parliament constituency), 1921–1929
 Down (UK Parliament constituency), 1801–1885 and 1922–1950
 Down (civil parish)
 Down county football team, Gaelic football
 Down, County Westmeath, Ireland
 Downe, Greater London, England, formerly called "Down"

People
 Down (surname)
 John Langdon Down (1828–1896), British physician best known for his description of Down syndrome
 Down AKA Kilo (born 1985), American rapper

Film and television
 Down (film), a 2001 English remake of the film De Lift
 "Down" (Breaking Bad), an episode of the second season of Breaking Bad
 "Down" (Into the Dark), an episode of the first season of Into the Dark

Literature
 Down (comics), a comic book published by Top Cow Productions
 Down (novel), a 1997 Bernice Summerfield novel by Lawrence Miles

Music
 Down (band), an American heavy metal supergroup
 Down (The Jesus Lizard album), 1994
 Down (Sentenced album), 1996

Songs
 "Down" (311 song), 1996
 "Down" (Blink-182 song), 2003
 "Down" (Fifth Harmony song), 2017
 "Down" (Jay Sean song), 2009
 "Down" (The Kooks song), 2014
 "Down" (Marian Hill song), 2016
 "Down" (Motograter song), 2003
 "Down" (R.K.M & Ken-Y song), 2006
 "Down" (Stone Temple Pilots song), 1999
 "Down", by Breaking Benjamin from Ember
 "Down", by Brymo from Merchants, Dealers & Slaves
 "Down", by Chris Brown from Exclusive
 "Down", by Davido from Omo Baba Olowo
 "Down", by Earshot from Two
 "Down", by Gravity Kills from Gravity Kills
 "Down", by Juelz Santana from From Me to U
 "Down", by Kutless from Kutless
 "Down", by Lindisfarne from Nicely Out of Tune
 "Down", by Mat Kearney from Young Love
 "Down", by Miles Davis released on Birdland 1951
 "Down", by Modern Day Zero
 "Down", by Pearl Jam from Lost Dogs
 "Down", by Pitchshifter from PSI
 "Down", by the Prom Kings from The Prom Kings
 "Down", by Seether from Holding Onto Strings Better Left to Fray
 "Down", by Widespread Panic from Don't Tell the Band
 "Down", by Yelawolf from Shady XV

Other uses
 Down (game theory), a standard position in mathematical game theory
 Rail directions, where down and up have locally significant meanings

See also
 "Down Down", a 1975 song by Status Quo
 Down GAA, responsible for the administration of Gaelic games in County Down
 Down quark, an elementary constituent of matter
 Down payment, a term used in the context of the purchase of items
 Down syndrome, a genetic disorder
 DN (disambiguation)
 Downe (disambiguation)
 Downhill (disambiguation)
 Downs (disambiguation)
 Downstairs (disambiguation)
 Downtown (disambiguation)